Sara bint Abdulaziz Al Saud (1916–2002) was one of the most prominent daughters of King Abdulaziz, founder of modern Saudi Arabia.

Early life
Sara was born in Riyadh to King Abdulaziz and Lajah bint Khalid bin Faisal Al Hithlain.

Personal life
Sara was married to Faisal bin Saad, son of her paternal uncle Saad bin Abdul Rahman. Princess Sara and Prince Faisal had six children, three sons and three daughters together.

Influence

Princess Sara was of high societal influence. She would host weekly family gatherings in her home for her father, King Abdulaziz, and her siblings.

References

Sara
Sara
1916 births
2002 deaths
Sara